Sir Harbottle Grimston, 1st Baronet (c. 1569–1648) was an English politician who sat in the House of Commons  variously between 1614 and 1648. He supported the Parliamentarian side in the English Civil War.

Grimston was the grandson of Edward Grimston, MP for Eye, and his wife Joan Risby. He was created Baronet of Bradfield in the County of Essex in the Baronetage of England on 25 November 1611.

In 1614 he was High Sheriff of Essex.  He was elected Member of Parliament for Harwich in 1614.

In 1626 Grimston was elected knight of the shire (MP) for Essex. He was re-elected in 1628 and held the seat to 1629 when King Charles decided to rule without parliament for eleven years. In April 1640 he was re-elected MP for Essex in the Short Parliament. In November 1640 he was elected MP for  Harwich in the Long Parliament. He held the seat until his death in 1648. 
 
Grimston married Elizabeth Coppenger, daughter of Ralph Coppenger of Stoke in Kent. They had five sons and the second Harbottle succeeded in the baronetcy.

See also
List of baronetcies in the Baronetage of England
List of extant baronetcies

References

1560s births
1647 deaths
Baronets in the Baronetage of England
16th-century English people
High Sheriffs of Essex
English MPs 1614
English MPs 1626
English MPs 1628–1629
English MPs 1640 (April)
English MPs 1640–1648
Harbottle